Big Kiss Goodnight is the second studio album by Baltimore, Maryland hardcore punk band Trapped Under Ice. It was released in 2011 on Reaper Records.

Track list

Personnel 
Additional personnel

 Chad Gilbert - production
 Paul Miner - recording, engineering, mixing, mastering
 Chad Soner - cover

References

2011 albums
Trapped Under Ice (band) albums